Bouka may refer to:

 Bouka (film), 1988 film directed by Roger Gnoan M'Bala
 Bouka, Benin, a town and arrondissement in the Borgou Department of Benin
 Bouko, a town and sub-prefecture in Zanzan District, Ivory Coast, that is alternatively spelled "Bouka"